Huang Mien-mien (born c. 1907) was a Taiwanese politician.

Huang was born around 1907, in Yunlin County. He attended . A member of the Kuomintang, Huang was elected to the Legislative Yuan in 1972, 1975, and 1980, from the functional constituency representing business.

References

1900s births
Year of death missing
Politicians of the Republic of China on Taiwan from Yunlin County
Party List Members of the Legislative Yuan
Kuomintang Members of the Legislative Yuan in Taiwan
20th-century Taiwanese businesspeople